Jennie Anderson may refer to:

Jennie Anderson Froiseth (1849–1930), founder of the Blue Tea, a literary club for women who were not Mormon in Utah Territory
Jennie Franks, English playwright and filmmaker, married Ian Anderson
Jane Whiteside (1855–1875), New Zealand tightrope dancer, gymnast and magician, also known as Jennie Anderson